Enter is the debut studio album by Dutch symphonic gothic metal band Within Temptation, released by DSFA Records in 1997. After the band became more widely known in foreign markets, it was released by the independent label Season of Mist in North America in 2007, and re-printed by Nuclear Blast in 2014. It was produced by Lex Vogelaar, founder of the Dutch death metal band Orphanage, and had to recorded, completed and mixed within three weeks.

The album prominently features lead singer Sharon den Adel's vocals as well as guitarist Robert Westerholt's gruff death metal growls. It is considered a gothic metal release with elements from doom metal, and the lyrics focus mostly on dark and supernatural themes. The track "Restless" was released as the first and only single. Although the album failed to achieve commercial success at the time of its release, it entered the Dutch Charts in 2002 after the commercial success of the band's following album.

Recording
One week after they signed with DSFA Records, Within Temptation started recording Enter. The tracks on the album were new versions of the tracks that had appeared on Within Temptation's demos. It was recorded in Studio Moskou, Utrecht, and it was completed and mixed within three weeks.

Robert Westerholt remembers that "it was incomparable to the first recordings we did earlier, this one was much more professional. After all a nice experience, but a very quick one. 'Enter' was recorded in two weeks and mixed in three days, so it was very difficult for we couldn't take time to develop songs. But it was a nice experience - it was our first album!" Vocalist Sharon den Adel recalls that "I only had one and a half days to record my parts and it was quite hectic, just a short warm-up and then 'Go'!" Lex Vogelaar, founder of the Dutch death metal band Orphanage, supplied the guitar parts for the track "Pearls of Light". Orphanage vocalist George Oosthoek performed some of the growls on "Deep Within".

Style
The album's style "sits between gothic metal and doom" and is very instrumental compared to the band's later works. Many of the songs have longer instrumental sections and fewer lyrics. On several songs Westerholt provides growling (in contrast to later albums on which it is rarely used). The lyrics focus on darkness, ghosts, and wars instead of the more common fantasy, love, and nature-centred lyrics found on later albums.

Future of the album
Although it didn't enter the Dutch albums chart in its release year, Enter eventually rose to No. 32 in 2002, after the great success of the song "Ice Queen". The album, along with The Dance were re-released in the US on 18 September 2007 by the label Season of Mist. After the great reception of later albums and the Hydra World Tour, Nuclear Blast decided to release a together re-issue of both Enter and The Dance on 10 November 2014, in order to give the new listeners access to the band's early material. By the end of 2018, the band released the album for the first time on vinyl format. It then entered the Dutch Vinyl Charts on number 6.

Live history

Songs from Enter were played live during Within Temptation's shows between 1997 and 1998. After that, only "Restless", "Enter" and "Deep Within" were played regularly during the Mother Earth Tour.

As of 2004, songs from the album Enter are not performed regularly anymore by Within Temptation. The title track and "Candles" were performed at the major concert at the Java Island in Amsterdam during The Silent Force Tour. "Enter" was last played at London in 2005, but "Candles" was played a few times in 2006 and at the Sportpaleis in Antwerp on 9 May 2012, during the 15-year anniversary concert "Elements"; the concert was released in November 2014 as part of the Blu-Ray/CD set called Let Us Burn – Elements & Hydra Live in Concert.

The only single from the album, "Restless", was performed again a few times during The Heart of Everything World Tour in 2007, being performed at shows in Germany, the Netherlands and the UK throughout October and November, and also the 2007 Fanclub Day in July. It was played once in Brazil in 2008 and then on the band's Sanctuary Theater Tour in 2012. At the eleventh version of the Metal Female Voices Fest, in October 2013, former Within Temptation member Martijn Westerholt, nowadays with Delain, played the song live with Sharon den Adel as a guest vocalist.

Track listing

Personnel

Within Temptation
Sharon den Adel – lead vocals
Robert Westerholt – rhythm guitar, unclean vocals
Michiel Papenhove – lead guitar
Martijn Westerholt – keyboards
Jeroen van Veen – bass
Ivar de Graaf – drums

Additional musicians
George Oosthoek – vocals on "Deep Within"
Lex Vogelaar – guitars on "Pearls of Light"
Guus Eikens – synthesizers/sound advice

Production
Lex Vogelaar - producer, mixing
Sylvia Vermulen - engineer
Oscar Holleman - mixing
Anthony van den Berg - executive producer

Charts

References

1997 debut albums
Within Temptation albums
Doom metal albums by Dutch artists
Season of Mist albums